The Last Inhabitant is a film created by Jivan Avetisyan․ It premiered at the 13th Golden Apricot Yerevan International Film Festival (GAIFF), in Armenia.

Festivals and awards 
The Last Inhabitant was considered for the 2017 Golden Globe Awards.

In June 2017 in Shanghai (China) at the 20th Shanghai International Film Festival the film was screened as part of the Panorama Program.

It was screened in “Venice Production Bridge” in September 2017 in Venice (Italy) at the 74th Venice International Film Festival.

In October 2017 in Helsinki (Finland) at the Scandinavian International Film Festival, the film won the "Best Feature" Award and actor Alexander Khachatryan won an award for "Best Actor".

Premiere 
The film opened in Armenia on November 17, 2016, at three main theaters including, CinemaStar, KinoPark and Moscow Cinema.

The Los Angeles premiere took place on April 7 at the Alex Theatre in Glendale, California. The screening was presented by the Artskah Arts and Cultural Foundation.

Synopsis 
The film is set in 1988, just before the dissolution of the Soviet Union. Evicted as a result of the Armenian-Azerbaijani conflict, Abgar stays behind alone inside a gradually shrinking enemy ring. He is waiting for his daughter, who has become a witness to her husband’s murder by an angry mob and was hospitalized with trauma. Ibrahim, an Azerbaijani, suggests that Abgar work on the construction of a mosque with the promise  to find and return Abgar's missing daughter. A few days later, Ibrahim finds the girl, named Yurga, in a psychiatric hospital of Baku and brings her to Abgar.

Cast 
 Alexander Khachatryan (Armenia) - Abgar
 Homayoun Ershadi (Iran) - Ibrahim  
 Sandra Dauksaite-Petrulene (Lithuania) - Yurga,
 Sos Janibekyan (Armenia) – Artist
 Dimitra Chatoupi (Greece) – Asli
 Anne Bedian (United States) – Rebecca
 Armen Grayg (Russia) – Commandant
 Babken Chobanyan (Armenia) - Razmik
 Narine Petrosyan(Armenia) – Operator
 Elfik Zohrabyan (Armenia) – Russian Soldier

Filmmakers
 Directed by: Jivan Avetisyan
 Screenplay: Tsovinar Khachatryan, Masis Baghdasaryan
 Producer: Masis Baghdasryan
 Co–Producers: Gevorg Gevorgyan, Kestutis Drazdauskas
 Executive Producer: Adrineh Mirzayan
 Editing: Eimantas Belickas
 Makeup: Zarina Karakhanova
 Costumes: Hovsanna Vanaturanc, Naira Muradyan
 Sound: Curtis Fritsch
 Production Design: Nahapes Sargsyan, Anton Keshishyan
 Cinematography: Tigran Khachaturyan
 Music: Serj Tankian

Production 
Production took place in the village of Khachmach, Artsakh. The film was completed in 2016 as a result of an international production between “Fish еye Art” Cultural Foundation, National Cinema Center of Armenia and the Lithuanian production house “Artbox”. The film making was supported by Apricot Stone of Sweden,  “Alpha Dogs, Inc” and “Mosaics Art & Cultural Foundation” both of the United States, as well as the Lebanese University Institute of Fine Arts 2 of Lebanon. The cast included actors from Iran, Lithuania, Greece, Russia and the United States.

Music
System of A Down rock group's vocalist Serj Tankian composed the music. The music was recorded with the participation of the Armenian Philharmonic Orchestra under Artistic Director and Principal Conductor Eduard Topchyan and Hover Chamber Choir under Artistic Director Sona Hovhannisyan.

Premieres  
 April 7, 2017 - USA, Los Angeles Alex theater
 February 2, 2017 –Stepanakert, AR “Vallex Garden Cinema”
 July 12, 2016 - Armenia, Yerevan, “Golden Apricot International Film Festival”, Moscow Cinema

Festivals/awards

References 

Armenian drama films
2016 films
Films directed by Jivan Avetisyan